Constantius II besieged the fortress city of Bezabde in Zabdicene in 360, held by the Sasanians. The Sasanians successfully defended the fortress city against the Roman attack.

The Romans had lost Bezabde earlier that year to the Sasanians following a siege led by Shapur II.

References

Sources
 
 
 

Battles of the Roman–Sasanian Wars
Sieges involving the Roman Empire
Sieges involving the Sasanian Empire
360s in the Roman Empire
4th century in Iran
Shapur II
Sieges of the Roman–Persian Wars
Constantius II